True Believers is a 1988 Australian miniseries which looks at the history of the Australian Labor Party from the end of World War II up to the Australian Labor Party split of 1955.

It was co-written by Bob Ellis who focused on three characters "Chifley, the unlettered man of great dignity; Menzies, who used to stand for something but eventually stood only for Menzies; and Evatt, the grand idealist... It's almost like Shakespeare's Henry IV, Part 1. It's a chunk of national history during Australia's great era of change after the war."

Cast

Ed Devereaux as Ben Chifley
John Bonney as Robert Menzies
Simon Chilvers as H.V. Evatt
Nick Tate as Les Haylen
Ray Meagher as Tom Burke
Harold Hopkins as Edgar Ross
Graham Rouse as Arthur Fadden
Gary Files as Fred Daly
John Derum as B.A. Santamaria
Tracy Mann as Tess Ross
Ron Blanchard as Arthur Calwell
Bryan Marshall as Richard Casey
Bob Baines as Stan Keon
Rob Steele as Clyde Cameron
Danny Adcock as Lloyd Ross
Diane Craig as Elsie
Valerie Bader as Mary Alice Evatt
Jeff Ashby as Garfield Barwick
John Ewart as Eddie Ward
Joan Bruce as Pattie Menzies
Malcolm Robertson as Idris Williams
Max Phipps as Sir Frank Packer
Norman Kaye as Archbishop Daniel Mannix
Stuart McCreery as Allan Dalziel

Production
The idea for the mini series and the title came from Bob Ellis, who pitched it to Matt Carroll at Channel Ten. Carroll commissioned Ellis and Stephen Ramsey to write it, originally as a feature film. In October 1984 Ten announced they did not want to make it.

The producers of The Petrov Affair reportedly tried to buy part of the script, but were turned down. Carroll took the project to Sandra Levy at the ABC and she agreed to make it provided it was done on videotape. If it was shot on film the estimated cost would be $5.6 million but on video it could be done for $3.4 million. It would be shown on the ABC for the Bicentenary. The project needed to be rewritten and Ellis and Ramsay refused. John Lonie rewrote the scripts.

Filming took place in October 1987.

Fred Daly watched the show and said "the bloke playing Chifley hasn't got the voice right but then nobody could get Chif's voice right."

Reception
Jim McCelland said "while I am prepared to concede that I may be an atypically political animal I have to report that I experienced not a moment of boredom in watching the eight hour mini-series... It pulls off that rare double-historical accuracy and rivetting entertainment."

Fred Daly called it "an excellent production."

References

External links

Films set in the Australian Capital Territory
1980s Australian television miniseries
1988 Australian television series debuts
1988 Australian television series endings
1988 television films
1988 films
Cultural depictions of Australian men
Cultural depictions of politicians
Films directed by Peter Fisk